Si nos dejan (English: If They Let Us) is a Mexican telenovela produced by W Studios for Televisa. The series is an adaptation of the 1993 Colombian telenovela Señora Isabel, which most recent popular version was Victoria. The series first aired in the United States on Univision from 1 June 2021 to 11 October 2021. In Mexico, the series aired on Las Estrellas from 1 November 2021 to 20 February 2022.

The series stars Mayrín Villanueva, Alexis Ayala, and Marcus Ornellas.

Plot 
Alicia Montiel (Mayrín Villanueva) has the perfect family and is married to Sergio Carranza (Alexis Ayala), one of the most respected and recognized journalists in Mexico. They have 3 children and are icons and the synonym of the ideal family in society. Alicia's world falls apart when she discovers that Sergio has been unfaithful to her for the last 3 years with the co-host from his television show, Julieta Lugo. Alicia works up the courage to divorce him and will have to face all the challenges that her new life will bring including falling in love with a man much younger than her, Martín Guerra (Marcus Ornellas), who is also a journalist and has been the professional rival of Sergio. Alicia will give in to a new love, she will challenge whoever dares to question her and in freedom, she will give a chance to true happiness.

Cast

Main 
 Mayrín Villanueva as Alicia Montiel de Carranza
 Marcus Ornellas as Martín Guerra
 Alexis Ayala as Sergio Carranza
 Scarlet Gruber as Julieta Lugo
 Isabel Burr as Yuridia "Yuri" Carranza
 Álex Perea as José Rafael Fuente "Cholo"
 Lorena Graniewicz as Karina Gómez
 Carlos Said as Gonzalo Carranza
 Isidora Vives as Miranda Carranza
 Mónica Sánchez Navarro as Yaya
 Víctor Civeira as Ángel “Diablo” Rentería
 Jorge Gallegos as Moisés Zapata
 Henry Zakka as Fabián
 Gabriela Carrillo as Carlota Vegas
 Ara Saldivar as Celia "Chela" Ortega
 Solkin Ruz as Lucas Bejarano
 Amairani as Maruja
 Paco Luna as Diego “Culebra”
 Ramiro Tomasini as Gutiérrez
 Natassia Villasana as Marcela Cruz
 Sofia Rivera Torres as Mabel Rangel
 Elissa Marie Soto Bazán as Sofía Guerra
 Roberto Mateos as Facundo Guerra
 Mónica Dionne as Rebecca
 Mauricio Pimentel as Alberto Mujica
 Gabriela Spanic as Fedora Montelongo
 Susana Dosamantes as Eva de Montiel

Recurring 
 José María Galeano as Samuel
 Pakey Vázquez as El Toro
 Gerardo Murguía as Julio Tamayo
 Paola Toyos as Prudencia
 Juan Pablo Gil as Francisco
 Karla Gaytán as Luna Cruz
 Claudia Zepeda as Lorena
 Nicole Curiel as Nicole
 Ana Celeste Montalvo as Ariana Mijares
 Marcelo Buquet as Quijada
 Ignacio Ortiz Jr. as Suso
 Arancha del Toro as Ladire
 Manuel Riguezza as Simón Guerra Vegas
 Manuel Castillo as Quique Cruz

Guest star 
 Sonya Smith

Production 
The telenovela was presented during the Univision upfront for the 2020–2021 television season. Mayrín Villanueva, Marcus Ornellas, and Eduardo Yañez were announced in the main roles on 2 February 2021. However, on 12 February 2021, it was announced that due to health issues Eduardo Yañez would no longer star in the series and that Alexis Ayala would be his replacement. Filming of the series began on 16 February 2021, with the rest of the cast being announced.

Episodes

Reception

U.S. ratings 
 
}}

Mexico ratings 
 
}}

Awards and nominations

References

External links 
 

2021 telenovelas
2021 Mexican television series debuts
2021 Mexican television series endings
2020s Mexican television series
Televisa telenovelas
Mexican telenovelas
Spanish-language telenovelas
Mexican television series based on Colombian television series
2021 American television series debuts
2021 American television series endings